Estradiol hemisuccinate/progesterone (EHS/P4), sold under the brand name Hosterona, is an injectable combination medication of estradiol hemisuccinate (EHS), an estrogen, and progesterone (P4), a progestogen, which is used to induce withdrawal bleeding in women with non-pregnancy-related amenorrhea (absence of menstruation). It is provided in the form of ampoules containing 20 mg/2 mL EHS and 100 mg/2 mL P4 and is administered by intramuscular injection. The medication is available in Argentina and Paraguay.

See also
 Estradiol/progesterone
 Estradiol benzoate/progesterone
 Estrone/progesterone
 List of combined sex-hormonal preparations

References

Combined estrogen–progestogen formulations